Cesta is a settlement in the Vipava Valley, 3 km west of Ajdovščina in the Littoral region of Slovenia.

References

External links 

Cesta at Geopedia

Populated places in the Municipality of Ajdovščina